Kalybe or Calybe may refer to:
 Calybe, a nymph in Greek mythology
 Calybe (beetle), a genus of beetle
 Kalybe (temple), a type of temple found in Roman Syria
 Cabyle (Thrace), town of ancient Thrace, also called Kalybe